The Abu Dhabi Media Summit is an annual three-day international news media summit held in Abu Dhabi, United Arab Emirates, dealing with the transition to digital technology in the Middle East, the Indian Subcontinent, East Asia, and China. It was first held from 18 to 20 March 2010. The summit is held under the Patronage of Sheikh Mohammed Bin Zayed Al Nahyan Crown Prince of Abu Dhabi and Deputy Supreme Commander of the United Arab Emirates Armed Forces.

The Media Summit deals with globalization  and with creativity and disruption. Speakers have included the inventor of the World Wide Web, Sir Tim Berners-Lee, Chairman of Walt Disney International Andy Bird, President and CEO of Discovery International Mark Hollinger, Bill Gates, Rupert Murdoch, James Cameron and Eric Schmidt.

Summits include public sessions, closed-door discussions and private conversations, bringing together industry leaders from developed and emerging areas. Industry sectors discussed include mobile, broadband, television, print, entertainment, news, music, advertising and  marketing, venture capital and equity finance.

During the inaugural summit on March 10, 2010 Eric Schmidt and Rupert Murdoch gave speeches on the theme of “The evolution of media and content platforms”. In 2011 film director James Cameron spoke about story-telling under the theme of “content and creativity”. The third meeting took place in October 2012 under the theme “redefining the digital frontier”, where Bill Gates gave the opening speech. The 2013 summit from October 22 to 24 had the theme “Leveraging the digital age”, with sponsors including Du, Sky News Arabia, the Telecommunications Regulatory Authority, Etihad Airways and Mercedes-Benz.

The 2014 Abu Dhabi Media Summit will take place from 18 to 20 November 2014 at Rosewood Hotel, Al Maryah Island in Abu Dhabi. The theme of the summit will be 'Driving & Sustaining Future Media in MENA and Beyond'.

See also 
 Arab Media Forum

References

External links 
 
 Abu Dhabi Media Summit - TheNational.ae Topic

 
International conferences in the United Arab Emirates
Events in Abu Dhabi
Annual events in the United Arab Emirates